Richard Trautmann (born 7 February 1969 in Munich, Bavaria) is a German judoka. He won two Olympic bronze medals in the extra-lightweight (–60 kg) division, in 1992 and 1996.

References

External links
 
 
 
 

1969 births
Living people
German male judoka
Judoka at the 1992 Summer Olympics
Judoka at the 1996 Summer Olympics
Olympic judoka of Germany
Olympic bronze medalists for Germany
Sportspeople from Munich
Olympic medalists in judo
Medalists at the 1996 Summer Olympics
Medalists at the 1992 Summer Olympics
21st-century German people
20th-century German people